This is a list of the National Register of Historic Places listings in Zion National Park.

This is intended to be a complete list of the properties and districts on the National Register of Historic Places (NRHP) in Zion National Park, Utah, United States.  The locations of National Register properties and districts for which the latitude and longitude coordinates are included below, may be seen in a Google map.

There are 29 properties and districts listed on the National Register in the park, 25 located within Washington County and three within Kane County.  The latter three are structures at the East Entrance to the park. A small portion of the park extends north into Iron County but includes no National Register-listed places.  The town closest by any practical route to all of these is Springdale, Utah.  (See also National Register of Historic Places listings in Washington County, Utah and National Register of Historic Places listings in Kane County, Utah.)

This list is sorted alphabetically.  Discussion of most of these, organized by type of property instead, is also provided in the following article: Historical buildings and structures of Zion National Park.



Current listings 

|}

See also
 National Register of Historic Places listings in Washington County, Utah
 National Register of Historic Places listings in Kane County, Utah
 List of National Historic Landmarks in Utah
 National Register of Historic Places listings in Utah

References

External links

National Register of Historic Places Inventory - Nomination Form Form: Multiple Resources for Zion National Park. National Park Service 1987 

Zion